Midland is an unincorporated community and a census-designated place (CDP) located in and governed by Teller County, Colorado, United States. The CDP is a part of the Colorado Springs, CO Metropolitan Statistical Area. The population of the Midland CDP was 156 at the United States Census 2010. The Divide post office  serves the area.

History
The Midland Terminal Railway maintained a station at Midland, midway between Divide and Cripple Creek.

Geography

Demographics

See also

Outline of Colorado
Index of Colorado-related articles
Colorado cities and towns
Colorado census designated places
Colorado counties
Colorado metropolitan areas
Front Range Urban Corridor
South Central Colorado Urban Area

References

External links

Teller County website

Census-designated places in Teller County, Colorado
Census-designated places in Colorado
1893 establishments in Colorado